The Iowa State Cyclones wrestling team represents Iowa State University (ISU) and competes in the Big 12 Conference of NCAA Division I. The Cyclones are 8 time National Champions, 17 time National Runners-Up, and have 45 Top 4 "Trophy" Finishes. The team is coached by Kevin Dresser.  The Cyclones host their home meets at Hilton Coliseum on Iowa State's campus. Iowa State became the second collegiate wrestling program to reach 1,100 dual wins on January 23, 2022.

Coaches

Charles Mayser (1916–1923)

Charles Mayser was the founding father of Iowa State wrestling. In addition to his wrestling coaching duties, “Uncle Charlie” performed coaching duties in baseball and football, as well as being the athletic director. Mayser joined the athletic staff in 1916, the initial season of Cyclone wrestling. He coached for eight years and was responsible for five undefeated teams during his tenure. Despite lack of equipment and facilities, Mayser's squads dominated the Midwestern wrestling scene. His teams suffered only two defeats in his last six years and his last two squads were named unofficial national champions by Amateur Wrestling News. Mayser left Iowa State in 1923 to head the Franklin & Marshall College athletic department.

During his eight years at Iowa State, Mayser went 35–4 during including one conference championship.

Hugo Otopalik (1924–1953)

Hugo Otopalik took over head coaching duties after serving as an assistant on Charles Mayser's staff for four years. In his 28 years as head coach, Otopalik's teams claimed seven conference championships and one NCAA title. He ended his illustrious career with a 159-66-5 mark and eight NCAA individual champions. Besides having a huge impact on Iowa State athletics, Otopalik also made his mark on the international scene. In 1932, Otopalik served as head coach of the U.S. Olympic squad, which captured the team title at the Los Angeles Games. He also headed the National AAU Wrestling Committee for five years.

During his 29 years at Iowa State, Otopalik went 159-65-6 including four conference championships and one NCAA championship.

Dr. Harold Nichols (1954–1985)

When you talk Iowa State wrestling history, Harold Nichols looms large. From 1965 to 1973, Nichols’ squads were the most dominant in wrestling, compiling five NCAA titles and three runner-up finishes. Nichols was named the successor to Hugo Otopalik in 1954 after serving as head coach at Arkansas State for five years. His ISU teams racked up six NCAA titles, seven Big Eight titles and produced 38 NCAA individual champions and 91 Big Eight titlists. His career record at Iowa State is an untouchable 456-75-11. Nichols was named coach of the year three times and was tabbed Wrestling Man of the Year by Amateur Wrestling News in 1966. He is a member of the Helms Foundation Wrestling Hall of Fame, Iowa Wrestling Hall of Fame, National Wrestling Hall of Fame and served as vice-chairman of the United States Olympic Wrestling Committee. Nichols retired from coaching in 1985.

During his 31 years at Iowa State, Dr. Nichols went 456-75-11 including seven conference championships and six NCAA championships.

Jim Gibbons (1985–1992)

In 1986, Jim Gibbons took over the reins of the Cyclone wrestling squad at age 26. Gibbons wrestled at ISU for Dr. Harold Nichols and earned All-America status three times, including the 1981 NCAA individual title at 134 pounds. Following his collegiate career, Gibbons served as an assistant coach at his alma mater for two years before taking over the head coaching duties. During his seven years as the Cyclone skipper, Gibbons’ squads claimed one Big Eight crown and captured the NCAA title in 1987. He also coached seven individual NCAA champions while compiling a 96-32-1 career coaching mark. After winning the NCAA Championships in 1987, Gibbons was named national coach of the year. He was named Big Eight Coach of the year in 1991. Gibbons retired from coaching after the 1992 season.

During his seven years at Iowa State, Gibbons went 96-32-1 including one conference championship and one NCAA championship.

Bobby Douglas (1992–2006)

A wrestling legend in his own right, Bobby Douglas was an NCAA runner-up at Oklahoma State and part of two Olympic teams as a competitor, finishing fourth at featherweight in the 1964 Tokyo Games. He was captain of the 1968 U.S. Olympic team in Mexico. Douglas coached the 1992 U.S. Olympic team whose 10 members placed among the top 10 in their respective weight classes, a U.S. Olympic first. He was a member of the U.S. Olympic coaching staff in 1976, 1980, 1984, and 1988. Douglas, a member of the National Wrestling Hall of Fame, was also on the 1996 and 2004 U.S. Olympic coaching staffs. Douglas began his collegiate coaching career at Cal-Santa Barbara before coaching three national champions and 58 All-Americans from 1975 to 1992 at Arizona State. His 1988 Sun Devil squad won the NCAA team title in Ames. He furthered his legacy at Iowa State, winning 198 dual matches. Douglas coached Cyclone wrestlers to 10 individual NCAA titles and 52 All-America performances. He is one of four collegiate coaches to win at least 400 duals matches.

During his 14 years at Iowa State, Douglas went 198-75-3.

Cael Sanderson (2006–2009)

Cael Sanderson, arguably the greatest collegiate wrestler of all time, took the reins of the Iowa State wrestling team at the start of the 2006–07 season. Sanderson led the Cyclone grapplers to an NCAA runner-up finish in his first year at the helm and guided the Iowa State squad to three consecutive Big 12 Conference championships. ISU didn't finish outside of the top five at the NCAA Championships under Sanderson's direction. After posting an undefeated record of 159–0 as a collegiate wrestler for ISU, Sanderson won an Olympic gold medal at the 2004 Summer Games in Athens, Greece. The former four-time NCAA champion brought aboard the top recruiting class in 2005, ranked by both Intermat and Amateur Wrestling News. Sanderson's 2007–08 squad garnered seven All-Americans at the NCAA Championships in St. Louis, which was Iowa State's largest All-American count since seven earned honors in the 1992–93 season. In total, Cyclone wrestlers notched 15 All-America honors in his tenure.  Cael Sanderson accepted the head coaching position at Penn State in April 2009.

During his three years at Iowa State, Sanderson went 44–10 including three conference championships.

Kevin Jackson (2009–2017)

Kevin Jackson was introduced as Iowa State's head wrestling coach on April 30, 2009. As a college wrestler, he attended LSU and earned All-America honors three times before the school dropped the sport. He transferred to ISU for his senior year and captained the Cyclones’ last NCAA championship team (1987), earning another All-America award with an NCAA runner-up finish and registering a 30-3-1 record. In 1992, Jackson won a gold medal at the Barcelona Olympic Games.  Since 1992, Jackson has coached for team USA at three summer Olympics including being the head coach for the Beijing Olympics in 2008. Jackson's last season for the Cyclones was a struggle, with a 1-12 dual meet record and scoring only one team point in the NCAA tournament.

Kevin Dresser (2017–present)

Dresser was announced as the new head coach on February 20, 2017.

Championships

Team championships

Individual NCAA championships

Individual Conference championships

Record

Olympians

Award winners

Hall of Fame

 National Wrestling Hall of Fame

Hugo Otopalik (1976)
Charles Mayser (1977)
Glen Brand (1978)
Dr. Harold Nichols (1978)
Dan Gable (1980)
Ben Peterson (1986)
Bobby Douglas (1987)
Dick Barker (1991)
Nate Carr (2003)
Kevin Jackson (2003)
Les Anderson (2004)
Larry Hayes (2004)
Chris Taylor (2012)

 FILA Hall of Fame

Kevin Jackson (2005)

Individual

Dan Hodge Trophy
Cael Sanderson (2000)
Cael Sanderson (2001)
Cael Sanderson (2002)

NCAA Outstanding Wrestler Award

Ron Gray (1959)
Dan Gable (1969)
Tim Krieger (1989)
Cael Sanderson (1999)
Cael Sanderson (2000)
Cael Sanderson (2001)
Cael Sanderson (2002)

NCAA Gorriaran Award

Tom Peckham (1966)
Dan Gable (1969)
Dan Gable (1970)
Chris Taylor (1973)
Johnnie Jones (1977)
Darryl Peterson (1985)
Eric Voelker (1988)
Matt Johnson (1991)

Big Eight Male Athlete of the Year

Tim Krieger (1989)
Chris Taylor (1973)

Big 12 Male Athlete of the Year

Cael Sanderson (2002)

Big 12 Scholar Athlete of the Year

Kyven Gadson (2015)

Coaching

NWCA Coach of the Year

Dr. Harold Nichols (1958)
Dr. Harold Nichols (1965)
Dr. Harold Nichols (1972)
Jim Gibbons (1987)
Bobby Douglas (2000)
Cael Sanderson (2007)
Kevin Dresser (2019)

Big Eight Coach of the Year

Jim Gibbons (1989)
Jim Gibbons (1991)

Big 12 Coach of the Year

Bobby Douglas (1999)
Bobby Douglas (2000)
Cael Sanderson (2007)
Kevin Dresser (2019)

Notable Iowa State Cyclone wrestlers

 Carl Adams – two-time NCAA Champion and three-time All-American 
 Glen Brand – Olympic gold medalist at 1948 Summer Olympics, NCAA Champion, two-time NCAA finalist and three-time All-American
 Bob Buzzard – Olympian at 1972 Summer Olympics in Greco-Roman wrestling, two-time NCAA All-American
 David Carr – Junior World Champion in freestyle wrestling, NCAA Champion and two-time All-American
 Nate Carr – Olympic bronze medalist at 1988 Summer Olympics in freestyle wrestling, three-time NCAA Champion
 Pat Downey – former member of Team USA Freestyle World Team in 2019, NCAA All-American at ISU
 Dan Gable – Olympic gold medalist at 1972 Summer Olympics in freestyle wrestling, World Champion in 1971, two-time NCAA Champion and three-time finalist, led Iowa Hawkeyes to 15 NCAA Team Championships as head coach
 Kyven Gadson – NCAA Champion and three-time All-American
 Kevin Jackson – Olympic gold medalist at 1992 Summer Olympics in freestyle wrestling, two-time World Champion, NCAA finalist at ISU
 Travis Paulson – former member of Team USA Freestyle World Team in 2010, three-time NCAA All-American
 Ben Peterson – Olympic gold medalist at 1972 Summer Olympics in freestyle wrestling, silver medalist at 1976 Summer Olympics, two-time NCAA Champion
 Cael Sanderson – Olympic gold medalist at 2004 Summer Olympics in freestyle wrestling, World silver medalist in 2003, four-time undefeated NCAA Champion, only wrestler in NCAA Division I history to go undefeated with more than 100 wins (159–0)
 Chris Taylor – Olympic bronze medalist at 1972 Summer Olympics in freestyle wrestling, two-time NCAA Champion
 Mike van Arsdale – former MMA fighter, NCAA Champion and three-time All-American
 Jake Varner – Olympic gold medalist at 2012 Summer Olympics, World bronze medalist in 2011, two-time NCAA Champion and four-time finalist
 David Zabriskie – NCAA Champion and three-time All-American

See also
Iowa State Cyclones
National Wrestling Hall of Fame and Museum
Glen Brand Wrestling Hall of Fame of Iowa

References

 
1916 establishments in Iowa
Sports clubs established in 1916